Sangam is village situated on Jammu-Srinagar National Highway in the Bijbehara tehsil of the Anantnag district of Jammu and Kashmir, India.

References

Villages in Anantnag district